The Wakaman(Tindale) otherwise spelt Wagaman are an Indigenous Australian people of the state of Queensland. According to some authorities, they may be interchangeable with the group identified by ethnographers as the Ewamin.

Country
The Wakaman are a savannah dwelling people of the headwaters of the Lynd River, whose northern extension ran to Mungana and the neighbourhood of Chillagoe. To the east their frontiers were on the Great Dividing Range, as far as Almaden. The western limits lay around Dagworth. On their southern flank, the frontier was around the area of Mount Surprise (near Brooklands). They were also present at Crystalbrook and
Bolwarra.

Social organization
The Wakaman tribe was divided into hordes of which two names at least survive.
 Okenyika.
 Tjapatja.

Alternative names
 Wagaman.
 Wakkamon.
 Warkaman, Warkeeman, Warkeemin.
 Warkamin, Warkemon, Warkeemon.
 Wataman.
 Okenyika.
 Tjapatja.

Notes

Citations

Sources

Aboriginal peoples of Queensland